A Foul Form is the twenty-sixth studio album by American garage rock band Osees, released on August 12, 2022, by Castle Face Records. Continuing the return to the faster, more aggressive punk sound that the band explored on Protean Threat, the album was described by frontman John Dwyer as "an homage to the punk bands we grew up on."

Background and recording
Inspired by a shared love of punk bands like Crass, Black Flag, and The Stooges, the band recorded and mixed the album entirely at frontman John Dwyer's home basement studio. Dwyer employed various studio techniques that were used in the recordings of various 70's and 80's punk albums, including using minimal amounts of reverb, miking the drums with as few microphones as possible, and plugging guitars straight into a midrange public address system instead of a guitar tube amplifier. Dwyer finished recording vocals and mixing the album over Christmas 2021 while sick with COVID-19, noting that the timing of symptoms gave harsher qualities to his vocal performance, as well as focusing his mixing efforts.

Track listing

Personnel
Credits adapted from vinyl record sleeve.

Osees
John Dwyer – guitar, vocals, synth, mixing
Tomas Dolas – guitar
Tim Hellman – bass
Dan Rincon – drums
Paul Quattrone – drums

Technical personnel
Enrique Tena Padilla – editing help
JJ Golden – mastering
Dylan McConnell – cover art
Titouan Massé – inner sleeve photo
Matthew Jones – layout
Harry Waine – Castle Face Records logo

Charts

References

2020 albums
Oh Sees albums